Genesis  is an instrumental jazz single released by Matthew Shell and Arun Shenoy on April 25, 2013.  It features the Canadian violinist Ian Cameron and guest musicians from around the world. In an interview  on Hybrid Jazz by Trish Hennessey, Shenoy talks about The Violin Song (from Shenoy’s album Rumbadoodle) being an inspiration for Shell to reach out to Shenoy, for the song originally written by Shell and based on a funk piano and guitar groove.  The accompanying music video  was created by Jason Baustin, of Travestee Films   by combining footage from the recording sessions in Armenia, India, Germany, and various locations in the U.S.

In 2014, the song was featured on the soundtrack of the documentary The Politics of Fashion: DC Unboxed

Track listing

Production and Personnel 
The following personnel were involved in the recording 

 Matthew Shell - Arranger, Composer, Engineer, Mixing, Primary Artist, Producer
 Arun Shenoy	- Arranger, Composer, Primary Artist
 Ian Cameron	- Composer, Violin
 Vahagn Stepanyan	- Keyboards, Piano
 Sebastian Wyrobisch - Drums
 Teo Lee - Bass
 Jonathan Wesley - Arranger, Keyboards, String Arrangements
 Alexander Brusencev - Drum Engineering
 Emily Lazar - Mastering
 Conrad Osipowicz - Engineer
 Jason Baustin - Editing, Video Director

See also

 Arun Shenoy
 Matthew Shell

References

2013 songs
2013 singles